The 1926 Alabama gubernatorial election took place on November 2, 1926, in order to elect the governor of Alabama. Democratic incumbent William W. Brandon was term-limited, and could not seek a second consecutive term.

Democratic primary
At the time this election took place, Alabama, as with most other southern states, was solidly Democratic, and the Republican Party had such diminished influence that the Democratic primary was the de facto contest for state offices; after winning the Democratic primary it was a given you would win the general election.

Candidates
 Archibald Hill Carmichael, former state senator
 Bibb Graves, candidate for governor in 1922
 Charles S. McDowell, lieutenant governor

Results

Results

References

1926
gubernatorial
Alabama
November 1926 events